Craig Lake State Park is a remote public recreation area covering  in Baraga County in the Upper Peninsula of the state of Michigan. The state park has several lakes that are accessible only by foot or paddling.

History
The property was once the private preserve of Fred Miller, president of the Miller Brewing Company. Miller built cabins that are still in use and named three of the area's lakes after his children Teddy, Craig, and Claire. After Miller's death in 1954, the state, which already owned land in the vicinity, was able to purchase more than two thousand additional acres from his estate in 1956.

Activities and amenities
The park's rugged hiking trails include an  loop around Craig Lake and a  stretch of the North Country National Scenic Trail. The park also offers rustic camping, fishing for muskellunge and northern pike, hunting, cross-country skiing, and snowmobiling.

Nearby protected areas include McCormick Wilderness and two areas owned by The Nature Conservancy: Wilderness Lakes Reserve and Slate River Timberlands.

References

External links 
Craig Lake State Park, Michigan Department of Natural Resources 
Craig Lake State Park Map Michigan Department of Natural Resources

State parks of Michigan
Protected areas of Baraga County, Michigan
Protected areas established in 1967
1967 establishments in Michigan
IUCN Category V